Heteropalpia profesta is a moth of the family Noctuidae first described by Hugo Theodor Christoph in 1887. It is found in the Near East, the Middle East, Iraq, Iran, Afghanistan, Transcaucasia, Turkmenistan and the Arabian Peninsula.

There probably are multiple generations per year. Adults are on wing from March to November.

The larvae possibly feed on Acacia species.

Subspecies
Heteropalpia profesta profesta
Heteropalpia profesta sacra (Israel)

External links

Image

Ophiusina
Moths of the Middle East